Rafael Moreno (born 16 July 1960) is a Dominican Republic former professional tennis player. He is a member of the Dominican Sports Hall of Fame.

Born in Santo Domingo, Moreno was the singles champion at the 1986 Central American and Caribbean Games in Santiago. This was the first ever tennis gold medal achieved by a Dominican player at the Central American and Caribbean Games. He was also the first male from his country to win a tennis medal at the Pan American Games, when in 1991 he teamed up with the singles silver medalist Joelle Schad for a bronze medal in the mixed doubles.

Moreno competed in 10 Davis Cup ties for the Dominican Republic from 1989 to 1993, winning nine singles and four doubles rubbers. His best win was a five-set triumph over Mauricio Hadad of Colombia. In 1996 he began a 25-year tenure as Davis Cup team captain, which included taking the team to a World Group Playoff against Germany in 2015. He retired from the position of Davis Cup captain in 2020.

References

External links
 
 

1960 births
Living people
Dominican Republic male tennis players
Tennis players at the 1991 Pan American Games
Pan American Games bronze medalists for the Dominican Republic
Pan American Games medalists in tennis
Central American and Caribbean Games medalists in tennis
Central American and Caribbean Games gold medalists for the Dominican Republic
Central American and Caribbean Games silver medalists for the Dominican Republic
Central American and Caribbean Games bronze medalists for the Dominican Republic
Competitors at the 1982 Central American and Caribbean Games
Competitors at the 1986 Central American and Caribbean Games
Competitors at the 1990 Central American and Caribbean Games
Sportspeople from Santo Domingo
Medalists at the 1991 Pan American Games
20th-century Dominican Republic people
21st-century Dominican Republic people